Alois Gerig (born 30 January 1956) is a German farmer and politician of the Christian Democratic Union (CDU) who served as a member of the Bundestag from the state of Baden-Württemberg from 2009 until 2021.

Political career 
Gering became a member of the Bundestag after the 2009 German federal election. In parliament, he was a member of the Committee on Food and Agriculture, which he chaired from 2015.

In July 2020, Gering announced that he would not stand in the 2021 federal elections but instead resign from active politics by the end of the parliamentary term.

References

External links 

  
 Bundestag biography 

1956 births
Living people
Members of the Bundestag for Baden-Württemberg
Members of the Bundestag 2017–2021
Members of the Bundestag 2013–2017
Members of the Bundestag 2009–2013
Members of the Bundestag for the Christian Democratic Union of Germany